The House of commerce, is an office tower located at Kringlan 7 near Kringlan shopping mall in Reykjavík, Iceland. The building was constructed from 1975-1981.

References

Towers in Iceland